Rhonda Ann Sing (February 21, 1961 – July 27, 2001) was a Canadian professional wrestler. After training with Mildred Burke, she wrestled in Japan under the name Monster Ripper. In 1987, she returned to Canada and began working with Stampede Wrestling, where she was their first Stampede Women's Champion. In 1995, she worked in the World Wrestling Federation as the comedic character Bertha Faye, winning the WWF Women's Championship. She also wrestled in World Championship Wrestling to help generate interest in their women's division.

Professional wrestling career

Training
While growing up in Calgary, Sing attended numerous Stampede Wrestling events with her mother. She knew she wanted to be a wrestler from a young age and frequently beat up the neighborhood children, along with those in her kindergarten class. As a teenager, Sing approached members of the Hart wrestling family and asked to be trained, but she was rejected as they did not train women wrestlers at the time. Bret Hart, however, claims it had more to do with scheduling conflicts. During a trip to Hawaii in 1978, she saw Japanese women's wrestling on television and decided she wanted to pursue the sport. She later wrote to Mildred Burke after a friend gave her a magazine with Burke's contact information, and sent her a biography and photo. Shortly thereafter, she joined Burke's training facility in Encino, California.

Japan, Canada, Mexico and Puerto Rico (1979–1995)
After a few weeks of training with Burke, Sing was scouted by All Japan Women (AJW), despite her inexperience. Sing's debut match in Japan was a tag team match with partner Mami Kumano, defeating the Beauty Pair (Jackie Sato and Maki Ueda) in January 1979. In Japan, she began wrestling under the name Monster Ripper. Although she found adjusting to the Japanese culture difficult, Sing held AJW's premier title, the WWWA World Single Championship, on two occasions and was the first Calgary born wrestler to gain success in Japan. During her time in the company, the Japanese female wrestlers gave her a hard time because they did not like losing to foreigners. Sing also had difficulty because of her youth and inexperience in the ring. Sing, however, was comforted by New Japan Pro-Wrestling's Dynamite Kid, who had trained in Calgary. Sing won the WWWA World Single Championship from Jackie Sato on July 31, 1979. Despite losing the title to Sato six weeks later, she regained it on March 15, 1980. The title was vacated in August 1980.

After another stint in Japan, Sing returned to Stampede Wrestling in late 1987 and was renamed Rhonda Singh by Bruce Hart, the owner of the company. There were plans to pair her with Gama Singh, but they never came to fruition. During 1987, she was named their first Women's Champion because she had defeated Wendi Richter prior to returning to Stampede. She held the title until September 22, 1988, when she lost to Chigusa Nagayo.

Over the next few years, Sing once again traveled throughout the world and wrestled for a number of companies, holding several titles. Between 1987 and 1990, Sing worked in Puerto Rico for the World Wrestling Council (WWC), where she held the WWC Women's Championship on five separate occasions by defeating Wendi Richter, Candi Devine, and Sasha in matches for the title. As Monster Ripper on the WWC 18th Anniversary Show on July 6, 1991, she faced and beat El Profe in an intergender match.

In 1992 she worked as La Monstra for Asistencia Asesoría y Administración in Mexico, where she won the WWA World Women's Title.

World Wrestling Federation (1995)

In 1995, Sing was contacted by the World Wrestling Federation to help their ailing women's division. She, however, was repackaged as Bertha Faye, a comedic character who lived in a trailer park and dated Harvey Wippleman. (in an OWW radio interview Wippleman revealed that the two never got along well) WWF management originally wanted her to have an on-screen feud with Bull Nakano, but there was a change of plans after Nakano was charged with cocaine possession.

Sing made her WWF debut on the April 3, 1995 episode of Monday Night Raw participating in a sneak attack on Alundra Blayze, making it appear as if Blayze's nose had been broken. At SummerSlam, Faye defeated Blayze for the WWF Women's Championship and held the title until the October 23, 1995 airing of Monday Night Raw, where Blayze regained the title, ending Faye's reign at only 57 days.

Fan interest in women's wrestling sunk again as the year closed, and Sing became tired of working there. Moreover, she was frustrated with her Faye gimmick, once recalling that she felt like a prostitute due to the sexualized and comical way that she was often portrayed. WWF management asked her not to perform the same power moves as the male wrestlers, so instead, Faye was forced to act as comic relief. After a year with the company, Sing asked for a release from her contract. She briefly returned to Japan but did not like the new system, which did not guarantee payouts.

Return to Mexico and Canada (1995–1999)
After leaving WWF, Sing returned to AAA in Mexico in 1996. During this period, she also worked in the independent circuit in Alberta, Canada.

World Championship Wrestling (1999–2000)
In late 1999, she worked with World Championship Wrestling (WCW) briefly, appearing on several telecasts to help generate interest in a women's division. She was also a contender for both the WCW Cruiserweight Championship and WCW Hardcore Championship. In addition to competing in matches using her Singh and Monster Ripper gimmicks, she also appeared with the Nitro Girls dance troupe providing comic relief.

Personal life
Backstage, Sing was friends with the male, rather than the female, wrestlers. During her time in the WWF, she developed a close friendship with Owen Hart.

After leaving WCW, Sing took a break from wrestling. In 2001, she worked as a caregiver to the disabled. According to her brother Tom, she had a "big heart" and "liked to look after people". On July 27, 2001, Sing died as a result of a heart attack at the age of 40. Sing's family attributed her death to a result of medical problems. Bruno Lauer disputed her cause of death in an interview with Online World of Wrestling Radio, where he stated that "she took herself out."  She never married or had children.

Championships and accomplishments
All Japan Women's Pro-Wrestling
IWA World Women's Championship (1 time)
WWWA World Single Championship (2 times)
AJW Hall of Fame (1998)
Cauliflower Alley Club
Posthumous Award (2003)
Stampede Wrestling
Stampede Women's Championship (1 time)
World Wrestling Association
WWA Women's Championship (1 time)
World Wrestling Council
WWC Women's Championship (8 times)
AWA World Women's Championship (1 time; unofficial) 
World Wrestling Federation
WWF Women's Championship (1 time)

See also
 List of premature professional wrestling deaths

References

External links 

 
 
 

1961 births
2001 deaths
AAAW Single Champions
AWA World Women's Champions
Canadian female professional wrestlers
Professional wrestlers from Calgary
Stampede Wrestling alumni
WWF/WWE Women's Champions
Expatriate professional wrestlers in Japan
20th-century professional wrestlers